Saint-Romain is a commune in the Charente department in southwestern France.

Geography
The commune is located in the south of the department, 1 km west of Aubeterre-sur-Dronne, 9 km north of Saint-Aulaye, 19 km west of Ribérac, 18 km south of Montmoreau and 48 km south of Angoulême.

In terms on surface area, Saint-Romain is the largest commune of its canton, spreading up to 200m of Aubeterre town center. The commune sits on a low Cretaceous limestone plateau.

No rivers traverse Saint-Romain, but two small tributaries have their sources there: the Beauronne which flows south-west into the  Dronne river and a tributary of the Tude in the north, as well as the Écrevansou, a small spring that follows the commune's eastern limits.

Population

The population of the town has been growing since the eighties because of its proximity to Aubeterre and the influx of British immigrants.

The population is dispersed and the town has numerous hamlets and farms.

History
The oldest parish registers date back to 1660.

According to a 1747 inventory, another church existed in the commune, in the Villedieu hamlet. There was no trace of it by 1910.

In 1789, on the eve of the French Revolution, Saint-Romain, like many parishes, issued a list of grievances.

See also
Communes of the Charente department

References

Communes of Charente